The 2015 Ohio Bobcats football team represented Ohio University in the 2015 NCAA Division I FBS football season. They were led by 11th year head coach Frank Solich and played their home games at Peden Stadium. They were members of the East Division of the Mid-American Conference. They finished the season 8–5, 5–3 on MAC play to finish in a tie for second place in the East Division. They were invited to the Camellia Bowl where they lost to Appalachian State.

Schedule

Schedule Source:
,

Game summaries

at Idaho

Marshall

Southeastern Louisiana

at Minnesota

at Akron

Miami (OH)

Western Michigan

at Buffalo

at Bowling Green

Kent State

Ball State

at Northern Illinois

Appalachian State–Camellia Bowl

References

Ohio
Ohio Bobcats football seasons
Ohio Bobcats football